Yuri de Souza Fonseca (born 8 August 1982), known simply as Yuri, is a Brazilian footballer who plays for Spanish club SD Ponferradina as a forward.

He also holds Portuguese citizenship, and spent the majority of his professional career in Portugal and Spain, mainly with Ponferradina.

Club career
Born in Maceió, Alagoas, Yuri arrived in Portugal still in his teens, joining F.C. Maia in the Segunda Liga. His performances there attracted the attention of another club in the north, Primeira Liga's Boavista FC, for which he signed in January 2003.

However, Yuri could never impose himself at the side, going on to serve two loans in the process: he helped Gil Vicente F.C. to avoid top-flight relegation in his five-month spell, not being able to repeat it with G.D. Estoril Praia in the following season.

In summer 2005, Yuri moved to Iberian neighbours Spain, representing lowly Pontevedra CF. He also had a loan spell at UD Las Palmas in Segunda División, but only appeared in 12 matches out of 42 without scoring.

Yuri signed for SD Ponferradina in 2009, going on to achieve two promotions to the second tier during his spell– to which he contributed a total of 26 goals – and eventually becoming captain. In the 2012–13 campaign he ranked third in the second division scorers' list at 21, helping his team to the seventh position.

On 15 January 2017, following a brief spell in the China League One, Yuri returned to the Estadio El Toralín aged 34. He scored in double digits in division two in 2019–20 (18 goals), 2020–21 (11) and 2021–22 (14).

Personal life
Yuri's older brother, Igor, was also a footballer and a forward. They shared teams at Maia (where they arrived at a young age) and Pontevedra.

His cousin, Charles, also played several seasons in Spain and also represented Pontevedra.

References

External links

1982 births
Living people
People from Maceió
Sportspeople from Alagoas
Brazilian footballers
Association football forwards
Primeira Liga players
Liga Portugal 2 players
F.C. Maia players
Boavista F.C. players
Gil Vicente F.C. players
G.D. Estoril Praia players
Segunda División players
Segunda División B players
Pontevedra CF footballers
UD Las Palmas players
SD Ponferradina players
China League One players
Qingdao F.C. players
Brazilian expatriate footballers
Expatriate footballers in Portugal
Expatriate footballers in Spain
Expatriate footballers in China
Brazilian expatriate sportspeople in Portugal
Brazilian expatriate sportspeople in Spain
Brazilian expatriate sportspeople in China